Stefan Ullrich (born 20 February 1965) is a retired German rower. Together with Thomas Lange he won a national title and a silver medal in the double sculls at the 1990 World Rowing Championships.

References

1965 births
Living people
German male rowers
World Rowing Championships medalists for East Germany